Sergei Olkhovtsev (born October 19, 1987) is a professional ice hockey player who is currently playing for Torpedo Nizhny Novgorod in the Kontinental Hockey League (KHL).

External links

Living people
Torpedo Nizhny Novgorod players
1987 births
Place of birth missing (living people)
Russian ice hockey defencemen